Devour the Power is the debut album by American heavy metal band Destroy Destroy Destroy.

Track listing

Personnel 
Bryan Kemp - lead vocals
Jeremiah Scott - guitar
Way Barrier - guitar
Adam Phillips - bass guitar
Eric W. Brown - drums
Alex Gillette - keyboards

References 

2006 debut albums
Destroy Destroy Destroy albums
Black Market Activities albums